John Tradescant may refer to:
John Tradescant the elder (1570s–1638) 
his son John Tradescant the younger (1608–1662)